The Medal of the Republic is one of the People's Republic of China's two highest decorations for Chinese nationals. On December 27, 2015, the National People's Congress Standing Committee passed a law establishing three national orders of merit: the Republic Medal, National Honorary Titles – for contributions in specific fields and industries – and the international Friendship Medal, constituted on January 1, 2016.

Description 
The Republic Medal adopts an overall color scheme of red and gold. The badge features the National Emblem and the five-pointed star, as well as symbolic representations of the Yellow River, the Yangtze, mountain peaks, and peonies (specifically the  牡丹, or Paeonia × suffruticosa). The chain incorporates motifs inspired by the Chinese knot, the ruyi, and orchid. Various metalworking techniques, including cold-press forging, filigree inlay, and enamelling, are involved in the process of its production.

Recipients 
2019
 Yu Min
 Shen Jilan (female)
 Sun Jiadong
 Li Yannian
 Zhang Fuqing
 Yuan Longping
 Huang Xuhua
 Tu Youyou (female)

2020
 Zhong Nanshan

References 

Orders, decorations, and medals of the People's Republic of China